The 1853 Texas gubernatorial election was held on August 1, 1853 to elect the governor of Texas. 

Incumbent Governor Peter Hansborough Bell did not run for a third term. The election was won by Elisha M. Pease, who received 37% of the vote.

Results

References

1853 United States gubernatorial elections
Gubernatorial
1853
August 1853 events